The mimic cavesnail, scientific name Phreatodrobia imitata, is a species of very small or minute freshwater snail with a gill and an operculum, an aquatic gastropod mollusk in the family Hydrobiidae.

Distribution
This species is endemic to the United States. Type locality is Verstraeten Well, Bexar County, Texas.

Description 
The shell has 3.3-3.5 whorls. The average height of the shell is 1.01-1.03 mm.

References

Lithoglyphidae
Gastropods described in 1986
Taxonomy articles created by Polbot